The Western Union (WU) was a military alliance established between France, the United Kingdom and the three Benelux countries between 1948 and 1954. The flag of the Western Union, also referred to as the Western Union Standard, displays an unbroken chain of five rectangular links in the shape of an upside-down pentagon on a blue field, with a multicoloured border (red on the outside, gold, black and white) taken from the WU member states' flags.

Design

Field (badge design)
The field of the flag is blue, and displays an unbroken chain of five rectangular links in the shape of an upside-down pentagon.

Border
The border of the flag is multicoloured border (red on the outside, gold, black and white) taken from the WU member states' flags. The relative proportions of the border are approximatively: Red 3, each of the others 1. The total width of the border is approximatively half that of the depth of the flag. The number of links symbolises the Western Union's five members.

History

The flag was first seen in October 1949. The flag might also have been introduced and used as a command flag of Commander in Chief Admiral of the Fleet Rhoderick McGrigor during Exercise Verity in 1949, the only major exercise held by the organisation. The flag was also flown on a car belonging to Bernard Montgomery, Chairman of the Commanders-in-Chief Committee.

A photo of the flag is shown in the book entitled Badges on Battledress by Howard N. Cole (Aldershot, Gale & Polden, 1953). The original caption states: 'NCOs of the Corps of Royal Military Police displaying the Western Union Standard which incorporates the badge of the Headquarters, Western Europe Commanders-in-Chief'. It doesn't say where the photo is taken, although it might just be Fontainebleau.

Modification
The flag ceased to be used upon the creation of NATO's Headquarters, Allied Land Forces Central Europe (AFCENT) in August 1953, at which point one extra link was added to the emblem, symbolising the United States. Similar to the Western Union, AFCENT was based in Fontainebleau, France. AFCENT was later developed into Allied Joint Force Command Brunssum (JFCBS).

See also
 Flag of the Western European Union
 Flag of NATO
 Flag of the European Coal and Steel Community
 Flag of Europe
 Federalist flag

References

External links
 Flag of the Western Union, Flags of the World

Western Union (alliance)
Western Union
Western Union
Military flags